Jurassic Park is a 1993 American science fiction action film directed by Steven Spielberg, produced by Kathleen Kennedy and Gerald R. Molen, and starring Sam Neill, Laura Dern, Jeff Goldblum, and Richard Attenborough. It is the first installment in the Jurassic Park franchise, and the first film in the Jurassic Park original trilogy, and is based on the 1990 novel of the same name by Michael Crichton and a screenplay by Crichton and David Koepp. The film is set on the fictional island of Isla Nublar, located off Central America's Pacific Coast near Costa Rica, where a wealthy businessman named John Hammond (Attenborough) and a team of genetic scientists have created a wildlife park of de-extinct dinosaurs. But, when industrial sabotage leads to a catastrophic shutdown of the park's power facilities and security precautions, a small group of visitors, including Hammond's grandchildren, struggle to survive and escape the now perilous island.

Before Crichton's novel was published, four studios put in bids for its film rights. With the backing of Universal Studios, Spielberg acquired the rights for $1.5 million before its publication in 1990. Crichton was hired for an additional $500,000 to adapt the novel for the screen. Koepp wrote the final draft, which left out much of the novel's exposition and violence, while making numerous changes to the characters. Filming took place in California and Hawaii from August to November 1992, and post-production lasted until May 1993, supervised by Spielberg in Poland as he filmed Schindler's List. The dinosaurs were created with groundbreaking computer-generated imagery by Industrial Light & Magic, and with life-sized animatronic dinosaurs built by Stan Winston's team. To showcase the film's sound design, which included a mixture of various animal noises for the dinosaur sounds, Spielberg invested in the creation of DTS, a company specializing in digital surround sound formats. The film was backed by an extensive $65 million marketing campaign, which included licensing deals with over 100 companies.

Jurassic Park premiered on June 9, 1993, at the Uptown Theater in Washington, D.C., and was released on June 11 in the United States. It went on to gross over $914 million worldwide in its original theatrical run, becoming the highest-grossing film ever at the time, surpassing Spielberg's own E.T. The Extra-Terrestrial. This record was held until the release of Titanic in 1997. It received very positive reviews from critics, who praised its special effects and Spielberg's direction. Following its 20th anniversary re-release in 2013, Jurassic Park became the oldest film in history to surpass $1billion in ticket sales and the seventeenth overall. The film won over 20 awards, including three Academy Awards for its technical achievements in visual effects and sound design. In 2018, it was selected for preservation in the United States National Film Registry by the Library of Congress as being "culturally, historically, or aesthetically significant". The film was followed by five sequels – The Lost World: Jurassic Park (1997), Jurassic Park III (2001), Jurassic World (2015), Jurassic World: Fallen Kingdom (2018), and Jurassic World Dominion (2022).

Plot

Industrialist John Hammond has created Jurassic Park, a theme park of cloned dinosaurs, on the tropical Isla Nublar. After a dinosaur handler is killed by a Velociraptor, the park's investors, represented by lawyer Donald Gennaro, demand a safety certification. Gennaro invites chaotician Ian Malcolm, while Hammond invites paleontologist Alan Grant and paleobotanist Ellie Sattler. Upon arrival, the group is shocked to see a live Brachiosaurus and a whole herd of other dinosaurs.

At the park's visitor center, the group learns that the cloning was accomplished by extracting dinosaur DNA from prehistoric mosquitoes preserved in amber. DNA from frogs, among other animals, was used to fill in gaps in the genome of the dinosaurs. To prevent breeding, all the dinosaurs were made female by direct chromosome manipulation. The group witnesses the hatching of a baby Velociraptor and visits the raptor enclosure. During lunch, the group debates the ethics of cloning and the creation of the park. Malcolm warns about the implications of genetic engineering and scoffs at the park's conceptualization, saying that it will inevitably break down.

Hammond's grandchildren, Lex and Tim, join for a tour of the park, while Hammond oversees from the control room. The tour does not go as planned, with most of the dinosaurs failing to appear and the group encountering a sick Triceratops. The tour is cut short as a tropical storm approaches. Most of the park employees leave for the mainland on a boat, while the visitors return to their electric tour vehicles, except Sattler, who stays behind with the park's veterinarian, Dr. Harding, to study the sick Triceratops.

Jurassic Park's disgruntled lead computer programmer, Dennis Nedry, has been bribed by Dodgson, a man working for Hammond's corporate rival, to steal fertilized dinosaur embryos. Nedry deactivates the park's security system to gain access to the embryo storage room, and stores the embryos inside a container disguised as a Barbosal shaving cream can. Nedry's sabotage also cuts power to the tour vehicles, stranding them just as they near the park's Tyrannosaurus rex paddock. Most of the park's electric fences have also been deactivated, allowing the Tyrannosaurus to escape and attack the group. After the Tyrannosaurus overturns a tour vehicle, it injures Malcolm and devours Gennaro, while Grant, Lex and Tim escape. On his way to deliver the embryos to the island's docks, Nedry gets lost in the rain, crashes his Jeep Wrangler, and is killed by a venom spitting Dilophosaurus.

Sattler helps the game warden, Robert Muldoon, search for survivors; they only find an injured Malcolm, just before the Tyrannosaurus returns and chases them away. Grant, Tim and Lex take shelter in a treetop and encounter a Brachiosaurus herd. They later discover the broken shells of dinosaur eggs the following morning, and Grant concludes from this that the dinosaurs have been breeding, which occurred because of their amphibian DNA—animals like West African frogs can change their sex in a single sex environment, allowing the dinosaurs to do so as well.

Unable to decipher Nedry's code to reactivate the security system, Hammond and chief engineer Ray Arnold reboot the park's system. The group shuts down the park's grid and retreats to an emergency bunker while Arnold heads to a maintenance shed to complete the rebooting process. When Arnold fails to return, Sattler and Muldoon head to the shed. They discover the shutdown has deactivated the remaining fences and released the Velociraptors. Muldoon distracts the raptors while Sattler goes to turn the power back on before being attacked by a raptor and discovering Arnold's severed arm. Meanwhile, Muldoon is caught off guard and killed by the other two raptors.

Grant, Tim, and Lex reach the visitor center. Grant heads out to look for Sattler, leaving Tim and Lex inside. Tim and Lex are pursued by the raptors in a kitchen, but they escape, managing to lock one in freezer, and join Grant and Sattler, who have returned. The group reaches the control room and Lex uses Nedry's computer to restore the park's power, allowing them to call Hammond, who calls for help. As they try to escape by the main entrance, they are cornered by the two remaining raptors, but they escape when the Tyrannosaurus appears and kills them. Hammond arrives in a jeep with Malcolm, and the group boards a helicopter to leave the island for good.

Cast

Richard Kiley has a cameo appearance as the voice of the Jurassic Park tour vehicle guide.

Production

Development

Michael Crichton originally conceived a screenplay about a graduate student who recreates a dinosaur. He continued to wrestle with his fascination with dinosaurs and cloning until he began writing the novel Jurassic Park. Before its publication, Steven Spielberg learned of the novel in October 1989, while he was discussing a screenplay with Crichton that would become the television series ER. Spielberg recognized what really fascinated him about Jurassic Park was it was "a really credible look at how dinosaurs might someday be brought back alongside modern mankind", going beyond a simple monster movie.

Before the book was published, Crichton had demanded a non-negotiable fee of $1.5 million for the film rights and a substantial percentage of the gross. Warner Bros. and Tim Burton, Columbia Pictures and Richard Donner, and 20th Century Fox and Joe Dante bid for the rights, but Universal Studios eventually acquired them in May 1990 for Spielberg. After completing Hook, Spielberg wanted to film Schindler's List. Sid Sheinberg, president of Music Corporation of America (Universal Pictures's parent company at the time) gave the green light to Schindler's List on the condition Spielberg make Jurassic Park first. He said later by choosing a creature-driven thriller, he wanted to try to make a good sequel to Jaws, on land. Spielberg also cited Godzilla as an inspiration for Jurassic Park, specifically Godzilla, King of the Monsters! (1956), which he grew up watching. During production, Spielberg described Godzilla as the most masterful of all the dinosaur movies because it made him and viewers believe it was really happening.

To create the dinosaurs, Spielberg thought of hiring Bob Gurr, who designed a giant mechanical King Kong for Universal Studios Hollywood's King Kong Encounter. Upon reflection, he felt life-sized dinosaurs would be too expensive and not at all convincing. Instead Spielberg sought the best effects supervisors in Hollywood. He brought in Stan Winston to create the animatronic dinosaurs; Phil Tippett (credited as Dinosaur Supervisor) to create go motion dinosaurs for long shots; Michael Lantieri to supervise the on-set effects; and Dennis Muren of Industrial Light & Magic (ILM) to do the digital compositing. Paleontologist Jack Horner supervised the designs, to help fulfill Spielberg's desire to portray the dinosaurs as animals rather than monsters. Certain concepts about dinosaurs, like the theory they evolved into birds and had very little in common with lizards, were followed. This prompted the removal of the raptors' flicking tongues in Tippett's early animatics, as Horner complained it was implausible. Winston's department created fully detailed models of the dinosaurs before molding latex skins, which were fitted over complex robotics. Tippett created stop-motion animatics of the raptors in the kitchen and the Tyrannosaurus attacking the car. Despite go motion's attempts at motion blurs, Spielberg found the end results unsatisfactory for a live-action feature film. Muren told Spielberg he thought the dinosaurs could be built using computer-generated imagery; the director asked him to prove it. ILM animators Mark Dippé and Steve Williams developed a computer-generated walk cycle for the T. rex skeleton and were approved to do more. When Spielberg and Tippett saw an animatic of the T. rex chasing a herd of Gallimimus, Spielberg said, "You're out of a job", to which Tippett replied, "Don't you mean extinct?" Spielberg later injected this exchange into the script, as a conversation between Malcolm and Grant. Although no go motion was used, Tippett and his animators were still used by the production to supervise dinosaur movement. Tippett acted as a consultant for dinosaur anatomy, and his stop motion animators were re-trained as computer animators. The animatics made by Tippett's team were also used, along with the storyboards, as a reference for what would be shot during the action sequences. ILM's artists were sent on private tours to the local animal park, so they could study large animals – rhinos, elephants, alligators, and giraffes – up close. They also took mime classes to aid in understanding movements.

Writing

Universal paid Crichton a further $500,000 to adapt his own novel, which he had finished by the time Spielberg was filming Hook. Crichton noted that because the book was "fairly long" his script had about 10 to 20 percent of the novel's content; scenes were dropped for budgetary and practical reasons, and the violence was toned down. Malia Scotch Marmo began a script rewrite in October 1991 over a five-month period, merging Ian Malcolm with Alan Grant.

Spielberg wanted another writer to rework the script, so Universal president Casey Silver recommended David Koepp, co-writer of Death Becomes Her. Koepp started afresh from Marmo's draft, and used Spielberg's idea of a cartoon shown to the visitors to remove much of the exposition that fills Crichton's novel. While Koepp tried to avoid excessive character detail "because whenever they started talking about their personal lives, you couldn't care less", he tried to flesh out the characters and make for a more colorful cast, with moments such as Malcolm flirting with Sattler leading to Grant's jealousy. Some characterizations were changed from the novel. Hammond went from being a ruthless businessman to a kindly old man, because Spielberg identified with Hammond's obsession with showmanship. He also switched the characters of Tim and Lex; in the book, Tim is aged eleven and interested in computers, and Lex is only seven or eight and interested in sports. Spielberg did this because he wanted to work with the younger Joseph Mazzello, and it allowed him to introduce the sub-plot of Lex's adolescent crush on Grant. Koepp changed Grant's relationship with the children, making him hostile to them initially to allow for more character development.

Two scenes from the book were ultimately excised. Spielberg removed the opening sequence with Procompsognathus attacking a young child as he found it too horrific. For budgetary reasons Koepp cut the T. rex chasing Grant and the children down a river before being tranquilized by Muldoon. Both parts were included in film sequels. Spielberg suggested adding the scene where the T. rex pursues a jeep, which at first only had the characters driving away after hearing the dinosaur's footsteps.

Casting
William Hurt was initially offered the role of Alan Grant, but turned it down without reading the script. Harrison Ford was also offered the role of Grant, before Sam Neill was ultimately cast three or four weeks before filming began. Neill said "it all happened real quick. I hadn't read the book, knew nothing about it, hadn't heard anything about it, and in a matter of weeks I'm working with Spielberg". Janet Hirshenson, the film's casting director, felt Jeff Goldblum would be the right choice to play Ian Malcolm after reading the novel. Jim Carrey also auditioned for the role. According to Hirshenson, Carrey "was terrific, too, but I think pretty quickly we all loved the idea of Jeff".

Laura Dern was Spielberg's first choice for the role of Ellie Sattler though she was not the only actress offered the part. Robin Wright and Juliette Binoche turned down the role. Gwyneth Paltrow and Helen Hunt auditioned for the role of Ellie Sattler. Spielberg chose to cast Wayne Knight as Dennis Nedry after seeing his acting performance in Basic Instinct.

Ariana Richards, who plays Lex Murphy, said: "I was called into a casting office, and they just wanted me to scream. I heard later on that Steven had watched a few girls on tape that day, and I was the only one who ended up waking his sleeping wife on the couch, and she came running through the hallway to see if the kids were all right". Christina Ricci also auditioned for the role. Joseph Mazzello had screen-tested for a role in Hook, but was deemed too young. Spielberg promised him they would work together on a future film. Sean Connery was considered for the role of John Hammond before Richard Attenborough was chosen. It was Attenborough's first screen appearance as an actor in 13 years.

Cameron Thor had previously worked with Spielberg on Hook, and initially auditioned for the role of Malcolm, before trying out for the role of Dodgson. In the film, Dodgson gives Nedry a container disguised as a can of shaving cream that is used to transport the embryos. Thor said about his casting: "It just said 'shaving-cream can' in the script, so I spent endless time in a drug store to find the most photogenic. I went with Barbasol, which ended up in the movie. I was so broke that I took the can home after the audition to use it".

Filming

After 25 months of pre-production, filming began on August 24, 1992, on the Hawaiian island of Kauai. While the Dominican Republic and Costa Rica were considered as locations, given they are the novel's settings, Spielberg's concerns over infrastructure and accessibility made him choose a place where he had already worked. The three-week shoot involved various daytime exteriors for Isla Nublar's forests. On September 11, Hurricane Iniki passed directly over Kauai, costing a day of shooting. Several of the storm scenes from the film are of actual footage shot during the hurricane. The scheduled shoot of the Gallimimus chase was moved to Kualoa Ranch on the island of Oahu. One of the early scenes had to be created by digitally animating a still shot of scenery. The opening scene was shot in Haiku, on the island of Maui, with additional scenes filmed on the "forbidden island" of Niihau. The exterior of the Visitor Center was a large façade constructed on the grounds of the Valley House Plantation Estate in Kauai. Samuel L. Jackson was to film a lengthy death scene where his character is chased and killed by raptors, but the set was destroyed by Hurricane Iniki.

By mid-September, the crew moved to California, to shoot the raptors in the kitchen at Stage 24 of the Universal studio lot. Given the kitchen set was filled with reflective surfaces, cinematographer Dean Cundey had to carefully plan the illumination while also using black cloths to hide the light reflections. The crew also shot the scenes involving the power supply on Stage 23, before going on location to Red Rock Canyon for the Montana dig scenes. The crew returned to Universal to shoot Grant's rescue of Tim, using a fifty-foot prop with hydraulic wheels for the car fall, and the Brachiosaurus encounter. The crew filmed scenes for the Park's labs and control room, which used animations for the computers lent by Silicon Graphics and Apple. While Crichton's book features electric-powered Toyota Land Cruisers as the tour cars in Jurassic Park, Spielberg made a deal with the Ford Motor Company, who provided seven Ford Explorers. The Explorers were modified by ILM's crew and veteran customizer George Barris to create the illusion they were autonomous cars by hiding the driver in the car's trunk. Barris also customized the Jeep Wranglers featured in the production.

The crew moved to Warner Bros. Studios' Stage 16 to shoot the T. rex attack on the LSX powered SUVs. Shooting proved frustrating because when water soaked the foam rubber skin of the animatronic dinosaur, it caused the T. rex to shake and quiver from the extra weight when the foam absorbed it. This forced Stan Winston's crew to dry the model with shammys between takes. On the set, Malcolm distracting the dinosaur with a flare was included at Jeff Goldblum's suggestion. He felt a heroic action was better than going by the script, where like Gennaro, Malcolm was scared and ran away. The ripples in the glass of water caused by the T. rexs footsteps were inspired by Spielberg listening to Earth, Wind and Fire in his car, and the vibrations the bass rhythm caused. Lantieri was unsure how to create the shot until the night before filming when he put a glass of water on a guitar he was playing, which achieved the concentric circles in the water Spielberg wanted. The next morning, guitar strings were put inside the car and a man on the floor plucked them to achieve the effect. Back at Universal, the crew filmed scenes with the Dilophosaurus on Stage 27. Finally, the shoot finished on Stage 12, with the climactic chases with the raptors in the Park's computer rooms and Visitor's Center. Spielberg changed the climax to bring back the T. rex, abandoning the original ending where Grant uses a platform machine to maneuver a raptor into a fossil tyrannosaur's jaws. The scene, which already included the juxtaposition of live dinosaurs in a museum filled with fossils, while also destroying the bones, now had an ending where the T. rex saved the protagonists, and afterwards made what Spielberg described as a "King Kong roar" while an ironic banner reading "When Dinosaurs Ruled the Earth" flew. The film wrapped twelve days ahead of schedule on November 30, and within days, editor Michael Kahn had a rough cut ready, allowing Spielberg to go ahead with filming Schindler's List.

Dinosaurs on screen

Despite the title of the film's referencing the Jurassic period, Brachiosaurus and Dilophosaurus are the only dinosaurs featured that actually lived during that time; the other species featured did not exist until the Cretaceous period. This is acknowledged in the film during a scene where Dr. Grant describes the ferocity of the Velociraptor to a young boy, saying: "Try to imagine yourself in the Cretaceous period..."
 Alamosaurus appears as a skeleton in the Jurassic Park visitor center.
 Brachiosaurus is the first dinosaur seen by the park's visitors. It is inaccurately depicted as chewing its food and standing up on its hind legs to browse among the high tree branches. According to artist Andy Schoneberg, the chewing was done to make the animal seem docile, resembling a cow chewing its cud. The dinosaur's head and upper neck was the largest puppet without hydraulics built for the film. Despite scientific evidence of their having limited vocal capabilities, sound designer Gary Rydstrom decided to represent them with whale songs and donkey calls to give them a melodic sense of wonder. Penguins were also recorded to be used in the noises of the dinosaurs.
 Dilophosaurus was also very different from its real-life counterpart, made significantly smaller to ensure audiences did not confuse it with the raptors. Its neck frill and its ability to spit venom are fictitious. Its vocal sounds were made by combining a swan, a hawk, a howler monkey, and a rattlesnake. The animatronic model, nicknamed "Spitter" by Stan Winston's team, was animated by the puppeteers sitting on a trench in the set floor, using a paintball mechanism to spit the mixture of methyl cellulose and K-Y Jelly that served as venom.
 Gallimimus are featured in a stampede scene where one of them is devoured by the Tyrannosaurus. The Gallimimus was the first dinosaur to be digitized, being featured in two ILM tests, first as a herd of skeletons and then fully skinned while pursued by the T. rex. Its design was based on ostriches, and to emphasize the birdlike qualities, the animation focused mostly on the herd rather than individual animals. As reference for the dinosaurs' run, the animators were filmed running at the ILM parking lot, with plastic pipes standing in as the tree that the Gallimimus jump over. The footage inspired the incorporation of an animal falling as one of the artists did trying to make the jump. Horse squeals became the Gallimimuss sounds.
 Parasaurolophus appear in the background during the first encounter with the Brachiosaurus.
 Triceratops has an extended cameo, depicted as sick from eating a toxic plant. Its appearance was a logistical nightmare for Stan Winston when Spielberg asked to shoot the animatronic of the sick creature earlier than expected. The model, operated by eight puppeteers in the Kaua'i set, wound up being the first dinosaur filmed during production. Winston also created a baby Triceratops for Ariana Richards to ride on, a scene ultimately cut from the film for pacing reasons. Gary Rydstrom combined the sound of himself breathing into a cardboard tube with the cows near his workplace at Skywalker Ranch to create the Triceratops vocals.
 Tyrannosaurus was acknowledged by Spielberg as "the star of the movie", and he rewrote the ending to feature the T. rex for fear of disappointing the audience. Jack Horner called it "the closest I've ever been to a live dinosaur". While the consulting paleontologists did not agree on the dinosaur's movement, particularly its running capabilities, animator Steve Williams decided to "throw physics out the window and create a T. rex that moved at sixty miles per hour even though its hollow bones would have busted if it ran that fast". The major reason was the T. rex chasing a Jeep, a scene that took two months to finish. The dinosaur is depicted with a vision system based on movement, though later studies indicated the T. rex had binocular vision comparable to a bird of prey. Its roar is a baby elephant mixed with a tiger and an alligator, its grunts are that of a male koala, and its breath is a whale's blow. A dog attacking a rope toy was used for the sounds of the T. rex tearing a Gallimimus apart, while cut sequoias crashing to the ground became the sound of the dinosaur's footsteps.
 Velociraptor plays a major role in the film. The creature's depiction is ultimately not based on the actual dinosaur genus in question, which was also significantly smaller. Shortly before Jurassic Parks theatrical release, the similar Utahraptor was discovered, although it proved to be even bigger in appearance than the film's raptors. This prompted Stan Winston to joke, "We made it, then they discovered it". For the attack on character Robert Muldoon and some parts of the kitchen scene, the raptors were played by men in suits. Dolphin screams, walruses bellowing, geese hissing, an African crane's mating call, tortoises mating, and human rasps were mixed to formulate various raptor sounds. Following discoveries made after the film's release, most paleontologists theorize that dromaeosaurs like Velociraptor and Deinonychus were fully covered with feathers like modern birds. This feature is included only in Jurassic Park III for the male raptors, who are shown with a row of small quills on their heads.

Post-production

Special effects work continued on the film, with Tippett's unit adjusting to new technology with Dinosaur Input Devices: models which fed information into computers to allow them to animate the characters like stop motion puppets. In addition, they acted out scenes with the raptors and Gallimimus. As well as the computer-generated dinosaurs, ILM also created elements such as water splashing and digital face replacement for Ariana Richards' stunt double. Compositing the dinosaurs onto the live action scenes took around an hour. Rendering the dinosaurs often took two to four hours per frame, and rendering the T. rex in the rain took six hours per frame.

Spielberg monitored their progress from Poland during the filming of Schindler's List, and had teleconferences four times a week with ILM's crew. The director described working simultaneously in two vastly different productions as "a bipolar experience", where he used "every ounce of intuition on Schindler's List and every ounce of craft on Jurassic Park". Some of the software used to create dinosaurs and other visual effects was Pixar's RenderMan and Softimage 3D. Industrial Light & Magic also used the program Viewpaint, which allowed the visual effects artists to paint color and texture directly onto the surface of the computer models.

Along with the digital effects, Spielberg wanted the film to be the first with digital sound. He funded the creation of DTS (Digital Theater Systems), which allows audiences to "really hear the movie the way it was intended to be heard". The sound effects crew, supervised by George Lucas, were finished by the end of April. Sound designer Gary Rydstrom considered it a fun process, given the film had all kinds of noise—animal sounds, rain, gunshots, car crashes—and at times no music. During the process, Spielberg would take the weekends to fly from Poland to Paris, where he would meet Rydstrom to see the sound progress. Former ILM CG Animator Steve "Spaz" Williams said that it took nearly a year for the shots that involved computer-generated dinosaurs to be completed. Jurassic Park was finally completed on May 28, 1993.

Music

John Williams began scoring the film at the end of February, and it was recorded a month later. Alexander Courage and John Neufeld provided the score's orchestrations. As with Close Encounters of the Third Kind, another Spielberg film he scored, Williams felt he needed to write "pieces that would convey a sense of 'awe' and fascination" given it dealt with the "overwhelming happiness and excitement" that would emerge from seeing live dinosaurs. In turn more suspenseful scenes such as the Tyrannosaurus attack required frightening themes. The first soundtrack album was released on May 25, 1993. For the 20th anniversary of the film's release, a new soundtrack was issued for digital download on April 9, 2013, including four bonus tracks personally selected by Williams.

Marketing
Universal took the lengthy pre-production period to carefully plan the Jurassic Park marketing campaign. It cost $65 million and included deals with 100 companies to market 1,000 products. These included: three Jurassic Park video games by Sega and Ocean Software; a toy line by Kenner distributed by Hasbro; McDonald's "Dino-Sized meals"; and a novelization for young children.

The film's trailers provided only a fleeting glimpse of the dinosaurs, a tactic journalist Josh Horowitz described as "that old Spielberg axiom of never revealing too much" after Spielberg and director Michael Bay did the same for their production of Transformers in 2007. The film was marketed with the tagline "An Adventure 65 Million Years in the Making". This was a joke Spielberg made on set about the genuine, thousands of years old mosquito in amber used for Hammond's walking stick.

Release

Theatrical
Jurassic Park was premiered at the Uptown Theater (Washington, D.C.) on June 9, 1993, in support of two children's charities. The film had previews on 1,412 screens starting at 9:30 pm EDT on Thursday, June 10, and officially opened on Friday in 2,404 theater locations and an estimated 3,400 screens. Following the film's release, a traveling exhibition called "The Dinosaurs of Jurassic Park" began, showcasing dinosaur skeletons and film props. The film began its international release on June 25, in Brazil before further openings in South America and then rolling out around most of the rest of the world from July 16 until October. The United Kingdom premiere helped save the Lyric Theatre in Carmarthen, Wales from closure, an event chronicled in the 2022 film Save the Cinema.

Re-releases
In anticipation of the Blu-ray release, Jurassic Park had a digital print released in UK cinemas on September 23, 2011. It wound up grossing £245,422 ($786,021) from 276 theaters, finishing at eleventh on the weekend box office list.

Two years later, on the 20th anniversary of Jurassic Park, a 3D version of the film was released in cinemas. Spielberg declared that he had produced the film with a sort of "subconscious 3D", as scenes feature animals walking toward the cameras and some effects of foreground and background overlay. In 2011, he stated in an interview that Jurassic Park was the only one of his works he had considered for a conversion. Once he saw the 3D version of Titanic in 2012, he liked the new look of the film so much that he hired the same retrofitting company, Stereo D. Spielberg and cinematographer Janusz Kamiński closely supervised the nine-month process in-between the production of Lincoln. Stereo D executive Aaron Parry said the conversion was an evolution of what the company had done with Titanic, "being able to capitalize on everything we learned with Jim on Titanic and take it into a different genre and movie, and one with so many technical achievements". The studio had the help of ILM, which contributed some elements and updated effects shots for a better visual enhancement. It opened in the United States and seven other territories on April 5, 2013, with other countries receiving the re-release over the following six months. In 2018, the film was re-released in select theaters to celebrate its 25th anniversary.

Home media 
Jurassic Park was first released on VHS and LaserDisc on October 4, 1994. With 17 million units sold, Jurassic Park is the fifth best-selling VHS tape ever. Three years later, a THX certified Widescreen VHS was released on September 9, 1997.

The film was also first released as a Collector's Edition DVD and VHS on October 10, 2000, in both Widescreen (1.85:1) and Full Screen (1.33:1) versions, and as part of a box set with the sequel The Lost World: Jurassic Park and both movies' soundtrack albums. It was the 13th best-selling DVD of 2000 counting both versions, finishing the year with 910,000 units sold. Following the release of Jurassic Park III, a new box set with all the films called Jurassic Park Trilogy was released on December 11, 2001. It was repackaged as Jurassic Park Adventure Pack on November 29, 2005.

The trilogy was released on Blu-ray on October 25, 2011, debuting at number five on the Blu-ray charts, and nominated as the best release of the year by both the Las Vegas Film Critics Society and the Saturn Awards. In 2012, Jurassic Park was among twenty-five films chosen by Universal for a box set celebrating the studio's 100th anniversary, while also receiving a standalone 100th anniversary Blu-ray featuring an augmented reality cover. The following year, the 20th anniversary 3D conversion was issued on Blu-ray 3D.

The film, alongside The Lost World, Jurassic Park III and Jurassic World, was released as part of a 4K Ultra HD Blu-ray box set on May 22, 2018, in honor of the original film's 25th anniversary.

Television premiere
Jurassic Park was broadcast on television for the first time on May 7, 1995, following the April 26 airing of The Making of Jurassic Park. Some 68.12 million people tuned in to watch, garnering NBC a 36 percent share of all available viewers that night. Jurassic Park was the highest-rated theatrical film broadcast on television by any network since the April 1987 airing of Trading Places. In June–July 1995 the film was aired a number of times on the Turner Network Television (TNT) network.

Reception

Box office
Jurassic Park became the highest-grossing film released worldwide up to that time, replacing Spielberg's own E.T. the Extra-Terrestrial (1982). It grossed $3.1 million from Thursday night screenings in the United States and Canada on June 10, and $50.1 million in its first weekend from 2,404 theaters, breaking the opening weekend record set by Batman Returns the year before. The film would hold that record for two years until 1995 when Batman Forever took it. Upon opening, it became the first film to generate $50 million in a single weekend. By the end of its first week, Jurassic Park had grossed a record $81.7 million. It grossed $100 million in a record nine days and remained at number one for three weeks. It eventually grossed $357 million in the U.S. and Canada, ranking second of all-time behind E.T. Box Office Mojo estimates the film sold over 86.2 million tickets in the US in its initial theatrical run.

The film also did very well in international markets and was the first to gross $500 million overseas, surpassing the record $280 million overseas gross of E.T. In its first international release date in Brazil, it also set an opening weekend record with a gross of $1,738,198 from 141 screens. It went on to break further opening records around the world including in the United Kingdom, Japan, India, South Korea, Mexico, Germany, Australia, Taiwan, Italy, Denmark, South Africa and France. In Japan, Jurassic Park grossed $8.4 million from 237 screens in two days (including previews). In the United Kingdom, it also beat the opening weekend record set by Batman Returns with a gross of £4.875 million ($7.4 million) from 434 screens, including a record £443,000 from Thursday night previews, and also beat Terminator 2: Judgment Days opening week record, with £9.2 million. The film held the UK record until it was beaten by Independence Day in 1996. After 12 days of grossing over £1 million a day, the film was the eighth highest-grossing film of all-time in the UK and after just three weeks, it became the highest-grossing, surpassing Ghost, eventually doubling the record with a gross of £47.9 million. Jurassic Park would remain as Europe's box office leader before being surpassed by Aladdin. In Australia, the film had the widest release ever and was the first film to open with a one-day gross of more than A$1 million, grossing A$5,447,000 (US$3.6 million) in its first four days from 192 screens beating the opening record of Terminator 2 and also beating the weekly record set by The Bodyguard with a gross of A$6.8 million. In the same weekend, it also set an opening record in Germany with a gross of DM 16.8 million ($10.5 million) from 644 screens. In Italy, it also had the widest release ever in 344 theaters and grossed a record Lire 9.5 billion ($6.1 million). It eventually opened in France on October 20, 1993, and grossed a record 75 million F ($13 million) in its opening week from over 515 screens. Its first week admissions in France of almost 2.3 million surpassed the previous record set by Rambo: First Blood Part II in 1985.

The film set all-time records in, among others, Germany, Hong Kong, Ireland, Israel, Japan (in US Dollars), Malaysia, Mexico, New Zealand, the Philippines, Singapore, Spain, Thailand and the United Kingdom. Ultimately the film grossed $914 million worldwide in its initial release, with Spielberg reportedly earning over $250 million from the film, the most a director or actor had earned from one film at the time. Its record gross was surpassed in 1998 by Titanic, the first film to gross over $1billion.

The 3D re-release of Jurassic Park in April 2013 opened at fourth place at the US box office, with $18.6 million from 2,771 locations. IMAX showings accounted for over $6 million, with the 32 percent being the highest IMAX share ever for a nationwide release. The international release had its most successful weekend in the last week of August, when it managed to climb to the top of the overseas box office with a $28.8 million debut in China. The reissue earned $45.4 million in the United States and Canada and $44.5 million internationally , leading to a lifetime gross of $402.5 million in the United States and Canada and $628.7 million overseas, for a worldwide gross of $1.029 billion, making Jurassic Park the 17th film to surpass the $1billion mark. It was the only Universal Pictures film to surpass the $1billion mark until 2015, when the studio had three such films, Furious 7, Minions, and the fourth installment of the Jurassic Park franchise, Jurassic World. The film earned an additional $374,238 in 2018 for its 25th anniversary re-release. In June 2020, due to the COVID-19 pandemic closing most theaters worldwide and limiting what films played, Jurassic Park returned to 230 theaters (mostly drive-ins). It grossed $517,600, finishing in first for the fourth time in its history. It became the first time a re-issue topped the box office since The Lion King in September 2011. It currently ranks as the 37th highest-grossing film of all time in the United States and Canada (not adjusted for inflation) and the 40th highest-grossing film of all time.

Critical response
Review aggregation website Rotten Tomatoes retrospectively reported an approval rating of 91% based on 136 reviews, with an average rating of 8.40/10. The site's critical consensus reads: "Jurassic Park is a spectacle of special effects and life-like animatronics, with some of Spielberg's best sequences of sustained awe and sheer terror since Jaws". Metacritic gave the film a weighted average score of 68 out of 100, based on reviews from 20 critics, indicating "generally favorable reviews". Audiences polled by CinemaScore gave the film an average grade of "A" on an A+ to F scale.

Janet Maslin of The New York Times called it "a true movie milestone, presenting awe- and fear-inspiring sights never before seen on the screen [...] On paper, this story is tailor-made for Mr. Spielberg's talents [but] [i]t becomes less crisp on screen than it was on the page, with much of the enjoyable jargon either mumbled confusingly or otherwise thrown away". In Rolling Stone, Peter Travers described the film as "colossal entertainment—the eye-popping, mind-bending, kick-out-the-jams thrill ride of summer and probably the year [...] Compared with the dinos, the characters are dry bones, indeed. Crichton and co-screenwriter David Koepp have flattened them into nonentities on the trip from page to screen". Roger Ebert gave the film three stars out of four: "The movie delivers all too well on its promise to show us dinosaurs. We see them early and often, and they are indeed a triumph of special effects artistry, but the movie is lacking other qualities that it needs even more, such as a sense of awe and wonderment, and strong human story values". Henry Sheehan of Sight & Sound argued: "The complaints over Jurassic Parks lack of story and character sound a little off the point", pointing out the story arc of Grant learning to protect Hammond's grandchildren despite his initial dislike of them. Empire magazine gave the film five stars, hailing it as "quite simply one of the greatest blockbusters of all time".

Accolades
In March 1994, Jurassic Park won all three Academy Awards for which it was nominated: Best Sound Editing, Best Sound Mixing, and Best Visual Effects (at the same ceremony, Spielberg, editor Michael Kahn, and composer John Williams won Academy Awards for Schindler's List). The film won honors outside the U.S. including the 1994 BAFTA for Best Special Effects, as well as the Award for the Public's Favorite Film. It won the 1994 Hugo Award for Best Dramatic Presentation, and the 1993 Saturn Awards for Best Science Fiction Film, Best Direction, Best Writing for Crichton and Koepp and Best Special Effects. The film won the 1993 People's Choice Awards for Favorite All-Around Motion Picture. Young Artist Awards were given to Ariana Richards and Joseph Mazzello, with the film winning an Outstanding Action/Adventure Family Motion Picture award. In 2001, the American Film Institute ranked Jurassic Park as the 35th most thrilling film of American cinema. The film is included in the book 1001 Movies You Must See Before You Die, film lists by Empire magazine, and The Guardian.

Legacy

Since its release, Jurassic Park has frequently been cited by film critics and industry professionals as one of the greatest movies of the action and thriller genres. The movie is also an example of a techno-thriller. The American Film Institute named Jurassic Park the 35th-most thrilling film of all time on June 13, 2001. On Empire magazine's 15th anniversary in 2004, it judged Jurassic Park the sixth-most influential film in the magazine's lifetime. Empire called the first encounter with a Brachiosaurus the 28th-most magical moment in cinema. In 2008, an Empire poll of readers, filmmakers, and critics also rated it one of the 500 greatest films of all time. On Film Reviews 55th anniversary in 2005, it declared the film to be one of the five most important in the magazine's lifetime. In 2006, IGN ranked Jurassic Park as the 19th-greatest film franchise ever. In a 2010 poll, the readers of Entertainment Weekly rated it the greatest summer movie of the previous 20 years.

The popularity of the movie led the management of the National Basketball Association expansion franchise founded in Toronto in 1995 to adopt the nickname Raptors. In addition, during the team's playoff games, fans watch the game on a large television in a fan area outside the arena, which has been nicknamed Jurassic Park. The film is seen as giving rise to the "Jurassic Park" generation, to young people inspired to become paleontologists and to a surge in discoveries about dinosaurs in real life.

Jurassic Park's biggest impact on subsequent films was a result of its breakthrough use of computer-generated imagery. The film is regarded as a landmark for visual effects. Film historian Tom Shone commented on the film's innovation and influence, saying that "in its way, Jurassic Park heralded a revolution in movies as profound as the coming of sound in 1927". Many filmmakers saw Jurassic Parks effects as a realization that many of their visions, previously thought unfeasible or too expensive, were now possible. ILM owner George Lucas, realizing the success of creating realistic live dinosaurs by his own company, started to make the Star Wars prequels; Stanley Kubrick decided to invest in pet project A.I. Artificial Intelligence, to which he would later bring Spielberg to direct; and Peter Jackson began to re-explore his childhood love of fantasy films, a path that led him to The Lord of the Rings and King Kong. Jurassic Park has also inspired films and documentaries with dinosaurs such as the American adaptation of Godzilla, Dinosaur from the Deep, Carnosaur (in which Laura Dern's mother Diane Ladd starred), Dinosaur Island and Walking with Dinosaurs. Stan Winston, enthusiastic about the new technology pioneered by the film, joined with IBM and director James Cameron to form a new special effects company, Digital Domain. In 2018, Jurassic Park was selected for preservation in the United States National Film Registry by the Library of Congress as being "culturally, historically, or aesthetically significant".

Future

After the enormous success of the film, Spielberg asked Crichton to write a sequel novel, leading to the 1995 book The Lost World. This, in turn, was adapted as the film The Lost World: Jurassic Park. Released in May 1997, it was directed by Spielberg and written by David Koepp. Another film, Jurassic Park III, was released in July 2001, under the direction of Joe Johnston, with Spielberg as executive producer. It featured an original script that incorporated unused elements from Crichton's original Jurassic Park. A fourth installment, Jurassic World, was released in theaters in June 2015. Spielberg again produced, with Colin Trevorrow directing a script he wrote with Derek Connolly. Jurassic World: Fallen Kingdom, the fifth film in the franchise, was released in June 2018, with Spielberg as producer once more and J. A. Bayona as director. A sixth film, Jurassic World Dominion, was directed by Trevorrow and released in theaters in June 2022.

The story of the film was continued in auxiliary media, at times even unattached to the film sequels themselves. These included a series of Jurassic Park comic books written by Steve Englehart for Topps Comics, and video games such as Ocean Software's Jurassic Park 2: The Chaos Continues (1994), Vivendi's Jurassic Park: Operation Genesis (2003) and Telltale Games' Jurassic Park: The Game (2011).

All of the Universal Destinations & Experiences include a Jurassic Park-themed ride. The first was Jurassic Park: The Ride at Universal Studios Hollywood on June 15, 1996, built after six years of development at a cost of $110 million. This attraction was replicated by Universal Studios Japan in 2001. Islands of Adventure in Orlando, Florida, has an entire section of the park dedicated to Jurassic Park that includes the main ride, christened "Jurassic Park River Adventure", and many smaller rides and attractions based on the series. At Universal Studios Singapore, opened in 2010, the Themed Zone named "The Lost World" consists mostly of Jurassic Park rides, such as the roller coaster Canopy Flyer and the river rapids Jurassic Park Rapids Adventure.

See also
Survival film

References

Bibliography

External links

 
 
 
 
 
 
 
 From Director Steven Spielberg: Jurassic Park archive 
 The Making of Jurassic Park (full documentary) at Documentary Mania

Jurassic Park films
Giant monster films
American monster movies
1990s monster movies
1990s science fiction adventure films
1993 films
2013 3D films
3D re-releases
Amblin Entertainment films
American films with live action and animation
American chase films
American science fiction thriller films
BAFTA winners (films)
Cultural depictions of mathematicians
Czech Lion Awards winners (films)
Films about dinosaurs
Films about genetic engineering
Films about siblings
Films adapted into television shows
Films adapted into comics
Films based on science fiction novels
Films based on works by Michael Crichton
Films directed by Steven Spielberg
Films produced by Gerald R. Molen
Films produced by Kathleen Kennedy
Films scored by John Williams
Films set in amusement parks
Films set in Costa Rica
Films set in Montana
Films set in the Dominican Republic
Films set in zoos
Films set on fictional islands
Films shot in Hawaii
Films shot in California
Films that won the Best Sound Editing Academy Award
Films that won the Best Sound Mixing Academy Award
Films that won the Best Visual Effects Academy Award
Hugo Award for Best Dramatic Presentation winning works
IMAX films
Jungle adventure films
American science fiction adventure films
Films with screenplays by David Koepp
Films with screenplays by Michael Crichton
Universal Pictures films
United States National Film Registry films
1990s English-language films
1990s American films